Muaskar Anole (Anole School) also known as Anoole, Caanole, Mu'askar Anole, Mucaskarka Caanoole, Caanoole Mu'askar,  Mucaskarka al-Furqan, al-Furqan Camp or al-Furqan Forces was an Islamist militia in Somalia. The group participated in the 2006–2009 insurgency against Ethiopia and in January 2009 merged with the Asmara based wing of the Alliance for the Re-liberation of Somalia, led by Sheikh Hassan Dahir Aweys, the Ras Kamboni Brigade, led by Sheikh Hassan Abdullah Hersi al-Turki and Jabhatul Islamiya to form Hizbul Islam which became the second most powerful insurgent group (after al-Shabaab) in Somalia which continued fighting the TFG and AMISOM peacekeepers, after Ethiopian withdrawal. Little is known about the group.

On 21 April 2009, Anole and the Ras Kamboni brigades fought each other in a village called Abdalla Birole, which lies 40 km west of Kismayo. This happened after Anole fighters invaded a village called Bulo Haji, while Ras Kamboni Brigade fighters arrived in Abdalla Birole and they clashed. The situation in the two villages was said to be tense, 4 people were killed and 7 injured during the fighting.

References

Guerrilla organizations
Islamic political organizations
Islamist groups
Jihadist groups
Organizations based in Africa designated as terrorist
Islamic terrorism in Somalia
Rebel groups in Somalia
2007 establishments in Somalia
2009 disestablishments in Somalia
Somalia War (2006–2009)
Factions in the Somali Civil War